, meaning a tiny stone (from  sharp stone), indicates a weight of  of a Roman ounce (i.e.) or, by extension, of other measures. Metaphorically, the stone is thought to be sharp and pricking, like a thorn.

 As a measure of time,  part of an hour, or  minutes.

See also 
 Roman currency

References 
, Hachette 1934

Coins of ancient Rome
Ancient Roman units of measurement
Units of mass